The Congress of Deputies (Spanish ) is the lower house of Spain.

Congress of Deputies may also refer to the following legislatures :
 the Congress of Deputies a.k.a.  (1931–1939), unicameral legislature of the Second Spanish Republic
 the Congress of People's Deputies of the Soviet Union (1989–1991)
 the Congress of People's Deputies of Russia (1990–1993)
 the Legislative Assembly of Costa Rica, a.k.a. Congress of Deputies
 the Congress of the Republic of Guatemala, made up of 160 Deputies
 the National Congress of Honduras, made up of 128 Deputies

See also 
 Congress (disambiguation)
 Deputy (legislator)
 Congress of People's Deputies (disambiguation)
 National Congress (disambiguation)